University of Las Condes was a Chilean private university.

It was founded in 1987 by retired Carabineros de Chile General César Mendoza and other investors. Mendoza was the president of the university's superior council until his death in 1996. In 1999, the university went through an economic crisis, which forced its owners to sell and merge it with Universidad del Desarrollo.

References

Private universities in Chile
Defunct universities and colleges
Educational institutions established in 1987
Educational institutions disestablished in 1999
1987 establishments in Chile
1999 disestablishments in Chile